Castions di Strada is a comune (municipality) in  the Italian region Friuli-Venezia Giulia, located about  northwest of Trieste and about  south of Udine.

Geography
Castions borders the following municipalities: Bicinicco, Carlino, Gonars, Mortegliano, Muzzana del Turgnano, Pocenia, Porpetto, San Giorgio di Nogaro, Talmassons.

Twin towns
Castions di Strada is twinned with:

  San Filippo del Mela, Italy

References

External links

 Official website

Cities and towns in Friuli-Venezia Giulia